PTX, Volume 1 is the debut extended play album by the a cappella group Pentatonix. It was released on June 26, 2012.

Conception and development
After winning the title of champion in the reality show The Sing-Off, Pentatonix was signed to a record label, enabling them to pursue their goal of a musical career. The group promoted their then-upcoming EP through YouTube videos with covers of pop songs such as "Somebody That I Used to Know" by Gotye featuring Kimbra, "Gangnam Style" by PSY, and "We Are Young" by Fun, which went viral.

Reception
The Gizzle Review gave the EP four stars out of five, praising the group by saying, "these new [cover song] versions are exquisite - filled with tight harmonies, impressive riffing and plenty of vocal bells and whistles." However, they also pointed out that, "This EP doesn't have the same variety of material as the group presented on The Sing Off (admittedly consisting of themed rounds)." hoping for more variety in future albums. Alt Rock Live gave a score of 9 out of 10: "Pentatonix brings so much energy into their music along with intense talent and creativity. Their sound is a little futuristic while staying firmly rooted in modern pop rock."

In 2013, the Contemporary A Cappella Society awarded the album with Best Pop/Rock Album, Best Pop/Rock Song for "Starships", and Best Soul/R&B Song for "The Baddest Girl".

Commercial performance
The album peaked at number 14 in the US Billboard 200 chart and number 5 on the digital chart selling 20,000 copies in its first week of release. It also peaked at number 2 on the US Billboard Top Independent Albums chart making it Madison Gate Records' highest charting release to date.

Track listing

Charts

Personnel 
 Pentatonix
 Mitch Grassi - tenor lead and backing vocals
 Scott Hoying - baritone lead and backing vocals
 Kirstin Maldonado - alto lead and backing vocals
 Avi Kaplan - vocal bass, bass lead and backing vocals
 Kevin Olusola - vocal percussion and backing vocals

 Production
 Ben Bram - production

References

External links 
 PTX, Volume 1 at Allmusic

Pentatonix EPs
2012 debut EPs
Covers EPs
Madison Gate Records EPs